Elijah Marcus Clarance (born 3 July 1998) is a Swedish professional basketball player who last played for Lovćen 1947 of the ABA League Second Division and the Prva A Liga.

Early career
Clarance played in the youth section of Swedish club Malbas.

College career
Clarance committed to play for Illinois State on 14 September 2016. In the 2017–18 season, he made his debut with the team, but saw his season cut short by injury as he averaged 2.7 points and 1.1 rebounds in 21 games.

Professional career
Clarance departed Illinois State to start his professional career with Fraport Skyliners of the Basketball Bundesliga.

On 9 August 2019, Clarance was sent on loan to New Heroes Den Bosch of the Dutch Basketball League (DBL). The 2019–20 season ended prematurely on 20 March because of the COVID-19 pandemic. In 20 games played, Clarance averaged 7.5 points, 2.3 rebounds, 2.8 assists and 1.3 steals per game.

On 1 January 2021, Clarance signed with Croatian club KK Vrijednosnice Osijek until the end of the season. In six games played, he averaged 14.2 points, 4.0 rebounds, 3.0 assists and 1.5 steals per game.

On 28 September 2021, Clarance signed with Lovćen 1947 of the ABA League Second Division and the Montenegrin League. He earned the Montenegrin League MVP and Top Scorer honors after averaging 19.9 points, 4.1 rebounds, 4.9 assists and 1.9 steals in 17 games played during the 2021–2022 season.

National team career
With the Sweden Under-20 team, Clarance played at the 2018 FIBA Europe Under-20 Championship. Here, he was the leading scorer of the tournament after averaging 22.4 points per game.

Personal life
Clarance is a Muslim. His mother is Swedish while his father was born in Trinidad. Clarance's older brother is former professional basketball player Bilal Clarance.

References

External links
Elijah Clarance at fiba.basketball
Elijah Clarance at eurocupbasketball.com
Elijah Clarance at RealGM.com

1998 births
Living people
Basketball players from Maryland
Dutch Basketball League players
Heroes Den Bosch players
Illinois State Redbirds men's basketball players
KK Lovćen players
KK Vrijednosnice Osijek players
Shooting guards
Skyliners Frankfurt players
Skyliners Juniors players
Swedish expatriate sportspeople in Croatia
Swedish expatriate basketball people in Germany
Swedish expatriate sportspeople in Montenegro
Swedish expatriate sportspeople in the Netherlands
Swedish expatriate basketball people in the United States
Swedish men's basketball players